Yerevan Confectionery and Macaroni Factory was an industrial enterprise based in Armenia. It was built in 1933. The confectionery and macaroni departments were amalgamated in 1951. In 1977, the factory became the first producer of chewing gum in Soviet Union, although the gum did not contain any chicle. The factory almost stopped the production during the collapse of Soviet Union in 1990's and was later privatized and restored by Grand Candy company in 2000.

References

Buildings and structures built in the Soviet Union
Industrial buildings in Armenia
Companies of Armenia
Food and drink companies of the Soviet Union
Buildings and structures completed in 1933
Armenian brands
Food and drink companies established in 1933